Goligher is a surname. Notable people with the surname include:

John Goligher (1912–1998), British colorectal surgeon
Kathleen Goligher (born 1898), Irish spiritualist medium